Veneziana is a sweet of the Lombard cuisine covered with sugar grains or almond icing. It is served in two versions: the bigger one is consumed during Christmas, like panettone; the smaller one is eaten as breakfast, along with cappuccino, like croissants. Veneziana is butter and flour-based and uses sourdough as leavening; the smaller version is usually plain, sometimes filled with custard, while the bigger version contains candied orange.

The history of veneziana is very similar to the history of panettone, which was created around XV century. This sweet was once eaten during celebrations like weddings and Christmas, while since the end of Second World War is considered a breakfast food. Buondì, a popular snack in Italy, is the industrial version of veneziana.

References 

Italian breads
Italian desserts
Breakfast dishes
Culture in Milan
Cuisine of Lombardy
Christmas food
Christmas in Italy
Yeast breads
Sweet breads
Brioches